Sodiq Atanda (born 26 August 1993) is a Nigerian professional footballer who plays as a centre back for Prishtina in the Football Superleague of Kosovo.

Club career

Partizani
On 24 December 2015, Atanda joined Kategoria Superiore side Partizani on a free transfer following the expire of his Apolonia contract. He made his league debut with the club on 30 January of the following year, playing ful-90 minutes in a 2–0 home success over Laçi.

In April 2016, Atanda produced strong performances by helping Partizani keep three clean-sheets in 4 matches, conceding only once, which helped him earn Albanian Superliga Player of the Month.

On 27 October 2017, he agreed a contract extension, signing until June 2019.

Hapoel Kfar Saba
On 25 June 2019, Atanda signed to Hapoel Kfar Saba.

International career
Atanda has made 5 appearances with Nigeria U23 squad.

Career statistics

Honours
Albanian Superliga Player of the Month: April 2016

References

External links
AFA profile

1993 births
Living people
Yoruba sportspeople
Nigerian footballers
KF Apolonia Fier players
FK Partizani Tirana players
Hapoel Kfar Saba F.C. players
FC Prishtina players
Kategoria e Dytë players
Kategoria Superiore players
Israeli Premier League players
Football Superleague of Kosovo players
Expatriate footballers in Albania
Expatriate footballers in Israel
Expatriate footballers in Kosovo
Nigerian expatriate sportspeople in Albania
Nigerian expatriate sportspeople in Israel
Nigerian expatriate sportspeople in Kosovo
Association football defenders
Sportspeople from Kano